Jason C. Ervin is the current alderman for Chicago’s 28th Ward. The 28th Ward is located on the West Side of Chicago.

Education and early career
Ervin has a Bachelor of Arts from Southern Illinois University at Carbondale and a Master of Public Administration from Governors State University. Prior to his appointment to the Chicago City Council, he was the village manager of Maywood, Illinois. He also is a  Certified Public Accountant (CPA) and graduate of Morgan Park Academy.

Aldermanic career
In 2010, Ervin was appointed by mayor Richard M. Daley to replace the retiring Ed Smith as 28th Ward alderman. Ervin was subsequently reelected in 2011, 2015, 2019, and 2023.

He is the Chair of the Committee on Contracting Oversight & Equity and Vice-Chair of the Committee on Workforce Development & Audit. He also serves on the following committees; Budget & Government Operations, Committees & Rules, License & Consumer Protection, and Finance.

In the runoff of the 2019 Chicago mayoral election, Ervin endorsed Toni Preckwinkle over Lori Lightfoot. Early into the mayoralty of Lightfoot, Ervin came into conflict with Lightfoot. However, he would ultimately develop into one of Lightfoot's strongest City Council allies, and has endorsed her for reelection in the 2023 Chicago mayoral election.

References

External links
Official Website

1974 births
African-American people in Illinois politics
American city managers
21st-century American politicians
Chicago City Council members
Governors State University alumni
Illinois Democrats
Living people
People from Maywood, Illinois
Southern Illinois University Carbondale alumni
21st-century African-American politicians
20th-century African-American people